The Z28 class was actually an amalgamation under one class of two former classes, comprising the Baldwin built formerly J.131 class, and the Eveleigh completed J.522 class. The Baldwin J131 class were first delivered in 1887, and the locally made J522 class delivered in 1893.

Gallery

See also
NSWGR steam locomotive classification

References

28
Scrapped locomotives
Standard gauge locomotives of Australia
2-8-0 locomotives